Sad pop is a subgenre of pop music.

See also 
 Sadcore

References

Pop music genres
2010s in music
2020s in music